Chromium(IV) silicide or chromium monosilicide is an inorganic compound of chromium and silicon with a chemical formula of CrSi. It is a metal with an electrical resistivity of ca. 2 Ω·cm.

References

Chromium(IV) compounds
Group 6 silicides
Iron monosilicide structure type